The  Little League World Series started in South Williamsport, Pennsylvania, on August 16 and ended on August 26. Eight teams from the United States and eight from throughout the world competed in the 66th edition of this tournament. Tokyo Kitasuna Little League of Tokyo, Japan, defeated Goodlettsville Baseball Little League of Goodlettsville, Tennessee, 12–2 in the World Championship game. For the country of Japan, it was the eighth LLWS championship overall, and the second in three years. This was the last World Series to feature players born in the 1900s.

Teams

Republic of China, commonly known as Taiwan, due to complicated relations with People's Republic of China, is recognized by the name Chinese Taipei by majority of international organizations including Little League Baseball (LLB). For more information, please see Cross-Strait relations.

Results

The drawing to determine the opening round pairings, as well as the unveiling of the schedule, took place on June 14, 2012.

United States bracket

International bracket

Crossover games
Teams that lose their first two games get to play a crossover game against a team from the other side of the bracket that also lost its first two games. These games are labeled Game A and Game B.

Consolation game
The consolation game is played between the loser of the United States championship and the loser of the International championship.

World Championship

Champions path
The Tokyo Kitasuna LL reached the LLWS by winning all 8 of their Tokyo and national tournament games. In total, they went undefeated with a 13–0 record.

References

External links
2012 official results via Wayback Machine

 
Little League World Series
Little League World Series
Little League World Series